Mammuthus lamarmorai is a species of mammoth which lived during the late Middle and Late Pleistocene (between 450,000 and perhaps 40,000 years) on the island of Sardinia. M. lamarmorai is a dwarf species, as it is estimated to have reached a shoulder height of only 1.4 m and weighed about 550 kg. This pygmy mammoth has been found mostly in the fine-grained sediments of the western part of the island.

Features
There is a great deal of fossil material known for M. lamarmorai, which includes cranial, dental, and post-cranial findings. Despite this wealth of material, no complete skeleton is known. Of the few known molars only one represents the rearmost tooth, which is 13 cm long and 6.9 cm wide, with at least eleven ridges on the enamel. The humerus reaches a length of 45 cm. The few discovered tusk fragments exhibit only a small maximum diameter of 3.5 cm. The length of the femur indicates a shoulder height of 1.4 m. Weight estimates have varied considerably, from 420 kilograms to 1650 kilograms. The small size of M. lamarmorai is due to a process of insular dwarfism, which occurred when its original large ancestors reached Sardinia and due to lower food supply and lack of potential predators they reduced their size.

Discovery
Most finds of M. lamarmorai were discovered on the west coast and in the western part of the island of Sardinia, and mainly comprise individual finds, but also belong to associated skeletal elements. The most important fossils are from Funtana Morimenta, a quarry south-southwest of Gonnesa in the valley of Rio Morimenta where it had already been discovered at the end of the 19th century. These fossils embedded in the Funtana-Morimenta lineup, which is composed of aeolian sedimentary formation that is located below a layer of strata dominated by a rock unit of conglomerates (the Tyrrhenian conglomerate). This rock formation is widely spread all over the west coast of Sardinia and is generally attributed to the last interglacial period that bears in northern Alpine region the term Eemian (126000–115000 years ago). The finds include mainly elements of the spine and musculoskeletal system, so among other things, a full foot, nearly complete hand, humerus and ulna, as well as remains of tusks. All discoveries are most likely to belong to a single individual. Other finds are known from San Giovanni di Sinis near Oristano, where a molar tooth was found in also deposited before the Eemian sediments, as well as an additional molar from Campu Giavesu in Sassari, which is, however, significantly larger. Finds from the Upper Pleistocene, which comprise a plurality of teeth are mainly from Tramariglio, near the city of Alghero, and came also from deposited sediments by wind, but above the Tyrrhenian conglomerate.

Classification
As a mammoth, M. lamarmorais closest living relative is the modern Asian elephant (Elephas maximus). The occurrence of this mammoth already in the late Middle Pleistocene makes that a descent from the classic woolly mammoth (M. primigenius) rather unlikely, since this latter species first appeared in Europe during the Upper Pleistocene. Rather, it is thought that the steppe mammoth (M. trogontherii), which lived on the continent, is the likely ancestor of M. lamarmorai. The steppe mammoth's molars had only eleven ridges, a feature much more archaic than those of the woolly mammoth, which had twenty six ridges.  The Cretan pygmy mammoth (M. creticus) and M. lamarmorai are the only known dwarf mammoths on the islands of the Mediterranean Sea, which were otherwise occupied by diminutive members of the genus Palaeoloxodon (also included sometimes in Elephas).

The first description was published in 1883 by Charles Immanuel Forsyth Major, who used the name Elephas lamarmorae. He no published pictures, but saw a clear link to the Southern mammoth (M. meridionalis), which he in turn called Elephas meridionalis due to similarities. The remains were from the quarry Funtana Morimenta and are now kept in the Natural History Museum of Basel, where Major personally studied them. Because of new tooth finds since the mid-20th century, it became clear the close connection to the mammoths, which is why the name Mammuthus lamarmorae prevailed.R. Melis, Maria Rita Palombo und M. Mussi: Mammuthus lamarmorae (Major, 1883) remains in the pre-Tyrrhenian deposits of San Giovanni in Sinis (Western Sardinia, Italy). In: G. Cavarretta, P. Gioia, M. Mussi and Maria Rita Palombo (eds.): The World of Elephants – International Congress. Consiglio Nazionale delle Ricerche. Rom, 2001, pp. 481–485 As a result of adaptation to the International Rules for Zoological Nomenclature, one amendment was made in 2012 for the name, and Mammuthus lamarmorai is currently the valid species name. The species name, lamarmorai, honors to the Sardinian General and naturalist Alberto La Marmora (1789–1863), who had already in 1858 investigated the fossils of Funtana Morimenta.

Chronology
The origin of M. lamarmorai is still relatively unclear – the earliest finds date from the latter part of the Middle Pleistocene, and it is thought that they colonised the island sometime after 450,000 years ago. This colonisation likely occurred during a glacial period in which the global sea level was much lower due to the continental ice sheets and the animals could reach the island by swimming. A partial tibia likely referrable to the species found near Alghero in NW Sardinia probably dates to MIS 3-4, around 57-29,000 years Before Present.

 Paleoenvironment 
During the Late Pleistocene Corsica and Sardinia had their own highly endemic depauperate terrestrial mammal fauna which besides M. lamarmorai included Tyrrhenian field rat,''' (Rhagamys orthodon) the Tyrrhenian vole (Microtus henseli), the Sardinian pika (Prolagus sardus), a shrew (Asoriculus similis), a mole (Talpa tyrrhenica), the Sardinian dhole (Cynotherium sardous), a galictine mustelid (Enhydrictis galictoides), three species of otter (Algarolutra majori, Sardolutra ichnusae, Megalenhydris barbaricina) and a deer (Praemegaceros cazioti'').

References

Pleistocene proboscideans
Extinct mammals of Europe
Mammoths
Fauna of Sardinia